Ctenopoma kingsleyae is a fish in the family Anabantidae found in the coastal rivers from Senegal to the Democratic Republic of the Congo, including the Senegal, Volta, Niger, and Congo River basins.

References

kingsleyae
Fish described in 1896